Dionisia is a genus of parasitic alveolates belonging to the phylum Apicomplexia.

The type species of this genus is Dionisia bunoi.

Taxonomy
The genus was described by Landau et al. in 1980.

Description 
The gametocytes are sexually dimorphic with the macrogametocytes being of the 'falciparum' type and the microgametocyte of the 'malariae' type.

The schizonts develop in the lumen of the liver blood vessels inside a greatly hypertrophied host cell. They remain moderate in size and their cytoplasm is not intensely basophilic as is usually in the young stages of other mammalian Haemosporidia.

Hosts 
The only known host of these parasites is the cyclops roundleaf bat (Hipposideros cyclops).

Geographical location 
These parasites are found in Gabon, Africa.

References 

Apicomplexa genera
Parasites of bats
Haemosporida